John Reeves may refer to:

Sports
John Reeves (baseball), American baseball player
John Reeves (Australian footballer) (1929–1970), Australian rules footballer
John Reeves (footballer, born 1963), English football (soccer) player for Fulham and Colchester United
John Reeves (American football) (born 1975), American football linebacker

Others
John Reeves (activist) (1752–1829), British judge, public official and conservative activist
John Reeves (naturalist) (1774–1856), English naturalist
John Sims Reeves (1821–1900), English operatic, oratorio and ballad tenor vocalist
John W. Reeves Jr. (1888–1967), U.S. Navy admiral
John Reeves (composer) (born 1926), Canadian composer, broadcaster, author, recipient of John Drainie Award
John Reeves (judge) (born 1952), Australian politician, lawyer and judge
John M. Reeves, after whom the Reeves Peninsula in Antarctica is named

See also
John Reaves (1950–2017), American football player 
John Reeve (disambiguation)